The 1996–97 Colorado Avalanche season was the Avalanche's second season. The franchise's 18th season in the National Hockey League and 25th season overall.

Offseason

Regular season

The Avalanche scored the most power-play goals during the regular season, with 83.

Season standings

Schedule and results

Playoffs

Western Conference Quarterfinals: (1) Colorado Avalanche vs. (8) Chicago Blackhawks

April 24, 1997: Patrick Roy shut out Chicago by a score of 7-0. He earned his 89th postseason victory and became the goalie with the most postseason wins, surpassing the old record set by New York Islanders goalie Billy Smith.

Western Conference Semifinals: (1) Colorado Avalanche vs. (7) Edmonton Oilers

Western Conference Finals: (1) Colorado Avalanche vs. (3) Detroit Red Wings

Player statistics

Note: Pos = Position; GP = Games played; G = Goals; A = Assists; Pts = Points; +/- = plus/minus; PIM = Penalty minutes; PPG = Power-play goals; SHG = Short-handed goals; GWG = Game-winning goals
      MIN = Minutes played; W = Wins; L = Losses; T = Ties; GA = Goals-against; GAA = Goals-against average; SO = Shutouts; SA = Shots against; SV = Shots saved; SV% = Save percentage;

Awards and records
 Sandis Ozolinsh, Defense, NHL First All-Star Team

Draft picks
Colorado's draft picks at the 1996 NHL Entry Draft held at the Kiel Center in St. Louis, Missouri.

References
 Avalanche on Hockey Database

C
C
Colorado Avalanche seasons
Presidents' Trophy seasons
Colorado Avalanche
Colorado Avalanche